The Mosscraft MA.1 was a British light two-seat low-winged sporting monoplane of the 1930s.

Design and construction
The Mosscraft MA.1 was designed and built in 1937 at the Moss Brothers Aircraft Ltd factory in Chorley, Lancashire, England. It was of wooden construction with fixed tail-wheel undercarriage and had two separate open cockpits, arranged in tandem.

Flying career
The M.A.1 was flown in several U.K. air races prewar, then was stored between 1939 and 1945. 

The aircraft competed postwar with the rear cockpit faired over. W.H.Moss flew it in the Kings Cup Air Race at Wolverhampton (Pendeford) Airport on 17 June 1950. He was killed during the race that day, when the aircraft crashed at the Newport, Shropshire turn.

Specification (MA.1 with cabin)

References

1930s British civil utility aircraft
Low-wing aircraft
Single-engined tractor aircraft
Aircraft first flown in 1937